The 1881 Lewisburg football team represented the University at Lewisburg—now known as Bucknell University—during the 1881 college football season. In the schools first-ever game, it lost to Penn State.

Schedule

References

Lewisburg
Bucknell Bison football seasons
College football winless seasons
Lewisburg football